Flakes is a 2007 American comedy film directed by Michael Lehmann and starring Aaron Stanford and Zooey Deschanel. This film was written by Chris Poche & Karey Kirkpatrick.

Plot
Struggling musician Neal Downs works as manager of a little New Orleans eatery called Flakes, owned by an old hippie, Willie B, that serves nothing but cold cereal to its loyal clientele. When a rival franchise opens up across the street, Neal's girlfriend, the self-named Pussy Katz, applies for a job at the new establishment as a means of getting back at Neal for refusing to hire her at his place.

Cast

Release and reception
Flakes was released in one theater on December 19, 2007. In the opening weekend (21-23), the film earned $311 at number 76. It lasted 9 days before closing and only being able to make $778.

, the film holds a 22% approval rating on the review aggregator site Rotten Tomatoes, based on 18 reviews with an average score of 4.4/10.

References

External links

2007 romantic comedy films
American romantic comedy films
American screwball comedy films
Films shot in New Orleans
American independent films
Films directed by Michael Lehmann
Films with screenplays by Karey Kirkpatrick
2007 independent films
2000s English-language films
2000s American films